Roqiyehabad (also Romanized as Roqīyehābād, Roqyehābād, and Roqīābād; also known as Rīgābād) is a village in Kahshang Rural District, in the Central District of Birjand County, South Khorasan Province, Iran. At the 2016 census, its population was 137, in 50 families.

References 

Populated places in Birjand County